Matyáš Klang (born 7 June 1991) is a Czech rower. He competed at the 2012 Summer Olympics in London with the men's coxless four where they came thirteenth.  He was part of the Czech men's eight that won silver at the 2011 European Championships in Plovdiv, and bronze a year later in Varese.

References

1991 births
Living people 
Czech male rowers
Olympic rowers of the Czech Republic
Rowers at the 2012 Summer Olympics
Rowers from Prague
European Rowing Championships medalists